Ricardo Jorge Gomes Carvalho (born 6 March 1996) is a Portuguese professional footballer who plays for Spanish club UD Almería B as a defender.

Career
Born in Santo Tirso, Carvalho started his career at Vitória de Guimarães in 2007. In 2013, he joined Benfica's youth system and was promoted to Benfica B in 2015, but did not play any match. In 2016, he returned to Guimarães where he debuted professionally on 9 March, with Vitória Guimarães B in a 2015–16 LigaPro match against UD Oliveirense.

On 31 August 2018, Carvalho moved abroad for the first time in his career, after agreeing to a contract with Segunda División B side Salamanca CF.

References

External links

Stats and profile at LPFP 
National team data 

1996 births
Living people
People from Santo Tirso
Portuguese footballers
Association football defenders
Liga Portugal 2 players
S.L. Benfica B players
Vitória S.C. B players
Segunda División B players
Tercera División players
Salamanca CF UDS players
UD Almería B players
Portugal youth international footballers
Portuguese expatriate footballers
Portuguese expatriate sportspeople in Spain
Expatriate footballers in Spain
Sportspeople from Porto District